Joshua Todd Gruber (born April 4, 1970), known professionally as Josh Todd, is an American musician, singer, songwriter and actor, best known as the lead singer of the American rock band Buckcherry.

Background 
Josh Todd grew up in Anaheim Hills, California, and later moved to Lake Forest, California. He attended high school at Trabuco Hills High School in Orange County, California, and graduated in 1989. Prior to his days in Buckcherry, Todd fronted the Hollywood glam rock band Slamhound. Slamhound was signed to Skydoor Records, an independent record company that was unsuccessful in releasing a Slamhound album even though the band recorded over a dozen songs with Todd as the lead singer.  While in Slamhound, Todd honed his musical style, moving away from glam and more towards punk. In 1995, Todd met guitarist Keith Nelson through his tattoo artist. The two agreed to meet because of their shared love of AC/DC. They soon formed the band Sparrow, which later changed its name to Buckcherry. He later married Jasmine Lawson, an American actress and model. He is currently married to actress/model Mitzi Martin. They have two children. Todd became a certified phlebotomist during the COVID pandemic.

Career 
In 1999, even before the debut Buckcherry album had ever been released, Todd was featured in one of Rolling Stone'''s last issues of 1999 as "What's Hot in the New Millennium," which included a center-fold photograph of him.

In 1999, Buckcherry released their debut self-titled album, featuring the hit "Lit Up".  The album had a very commercial sound, far away from the glam punk music of his earlier bands.

In 2001, the band released their second album Time Bomb. Todd and Nelson went on to play a tribute to Ozzy Osbourne/Mötley Crüe drummer, Randy Castillo, alongside former Guns N' Roses members Slash, Duff McKagan, and Matt Sorum. The band, for that show, was named Cherry Roses. The band went on to record about ten songs under the name "The Project" before the others decided to replace Todd and Nelson with Scott Weiland and Dave Kushner, respectively. The band went on to become Velvet Revolver. One song, "Dirty Little Thing", was written during the time with Todd and Nelson and gives the latter co-writing credits.

 The band Josh Todd 
In 2003, Josh Todd released the album You Made Me under the band name Josh Todd The band consisted of Josh Todd (Vocals), Jesse Logan (Guitars), Mike Hewitt (Guitars), Mark Lettig (Bass) and Kent Ross (Drums). The bands guitar tech was Stevie D. The album was distributed in the US by DRT Entertainment in the US, and by JVCKenwood Victor Entertainment in Japan. After returning from Japan supporting the You Made Me album, which included dates with Aerosmith and the Who, Josh Todd decided to return to the band Buckcherry. The Josh Todd band was disbanded, and TODD Entertainment was dissolved.

In 2012, JVC/Victor Entertainment re-issued and re-released the You Made Me album in Japan.

In 2022, the album was released for the first time worldwide through music streaming services  and included the songs "Collide" and "Catastrophe".

 The return to Buckcherry 
In 2005, Josh Todd reformed Buckcherry with Keith Nelson and new members Stevie D., Jimmy Ashhurst, and Xavier Muriel.

In 2006, he appeared as the character Hutch in the film The Still Life.

In 2008, Todd was one of the four backing vocalists for the hard rock band Mötley Crüe for the gang vocal version of "Saints of Los Angeles".

Todd has released nine albums with Buckcherry and one solo album. He also performed at the Canadian Live8 venue in Barrie, Ontario in 2005. He first joined Darryl McDaniels, Tom Hamilton and Joey Kramer of Aerosmith, and others on stage for a rendition of Aerosmith's "Walk This Way" and then later joined all other performers on stage for a version of Neil Young's "Rockin' in the Free World".

He has appeared in several films in both credited and uncredited roles including playing the part of "Rudy" in the 2002 teen comedy The New Guy and several small parts in XXX and The Salton Sea. He has also appeared in the 2008 thriller Eagle Eye.

In 2008 Todd appeared on Escape the Fate's album This War Is Ours in the songs 10 Miles Wide and "Harder Than You Know". He was featured in the music video for "10 Miles Wide" in 2009.

Todd has been ranked in the Top 100 Heavy Metal Vocalists by Hit Parader (#98).

Following Keith Nelson's departure from Buckcherry in 2017, Todd is now the only original member in the band.

 Discography 
 Slamhound 
 Chaos Personified (1995)

 Buckcherry 

 Josh Todd You Made Me (2003)

 Spraygun War 
 Into the Blackness EP (2016)

 Josh Todd and The Conflict 
 Year of the Tiger (2017)

 Guest appearances 
 2002 – The New Guy the movie. He played the character Rudy.
 2002 – The Shield series. Episode 1.6: "Cherrypoppers".
 2002 – The Banger Sisters Movie
 2003 – "Rain" – DJ Muggs – Dust 2006 – "Watchtower" – DMC – Checks Thugs and Rock N Roll 2007 – "Blow" – Atreyu – Lead Sails Paper Anchor 2008 – "Saints of Los Angeles" – Mötley Crüe – Saints of Los Angeles 2008 – "10 Miles Wide" – Escape the Fate – This War Is Ours 2010 – Bones (TV series). Episode 5.19: "The Rocker in the Rinse Cycle"
 2019 – "Back From the Dead" – Mark Morton – Anesthetic''

References

External links 

Official website for Josh Todd band
Josh Todd Official Website
You Made Me on Spotify
You Made Me on iTunes
You Made Me on Amazon Music

Living people
Singers from Los Angeles
American heavy metal singers
People from Anaheim Hills, California
Male actors from Lake Forest, California
1970 births
21st-century American singers
21st-century American male singers